Cybele bellatula is the fossil of an extinct trilobite from the Lower Ordovician. The genus was named after Cybele, the ancient Oriental and Greco-Roman goddess representing Gaia, the deified Earth Mother. The specific name means 'pretty, little' and is used as a term of endearment.

This trilobite fossil occurs in Russia, Sweden and Norway.

The Encrinuridae were a family of trilobites that occurred over regions that would eventually be Africa, Asia, Australia, Europe, North America, and South America.

The trilobites were a large and diverse group, numbering over 10,000 species. They appeared, flourished and became extinct in the Paleozoic. In the early Paleozoic their success was such that they outnumbered and were more diverse than most of their contemporaries.

References

External links
Introduction to Trilobites
A Guide to the Orders of Trilobites

Encrinuridae